Zhu Guo (born June 14, 1985 in Fuxin, Liaoning) is a male Chinese Taekwondo practitioner.

At the 2008 Summer Olympics Zhu won the bronze medal in the men's 80 kg category. He lost to eventual gold medalist Hadi Saei of Iran in the quarterfinals but captured bronze by defeating Aaron Cook of Great Britain and Deepak Bista of Nepal in the repechage.

External links
 Zhu Guo's profile and Olympics results from Sports-Reference

1985 births
Living people
Chinese male taekwondo practitioners
Olympic bronze medalists for China
Olympic taekwondo practitioners of China
People from Fuxin
Taekwondo practitioners at the 2008 Summer Olympics
Olympic medalists in taekwondo
Sportspeople from Liaoning
Medalists at the 2008 Summer Olympics
Asian Taekwondo Championships medalists
21st-century Chinese people